Japan competed at the 1956 Summer Olympics in Melbourne, Australia and Stockholm, Sweden (equestrian events). 110 competitors, 94 men and 16 women, took part in 71 events in 13 sports.

Takashi Ono from gymnastics is the most successful athlete with 1 gold, 3 silver and 1 bronze.

Medalists

|  style="text-align:left; width:72%; vertical-align:top;"|

|  style="text-align:left; width:23%; vertical-align:top;"|

Athletics

Men's Marathon 
Yoshiaki Kawashima — 2:29:19 (→ 5th place)
Hideo Hamamura — 2:40:53 (→ 16th place)
Kurao Hiroshima — 3:04:17 (→ 33rd place)

Basketball

Boxing

Cycling

Time trial
Tetsuo Ōsawa — 1:13.3 (→ 12th place)

Individual road race
Tetsuo Ōsawa — did not finish (→ no ranking)

Diving

Men's 10m Platform
Yutaka Baba
 Preliminary Round — 70.76
 Final — 123.69 (→ 11th place)

Ryō Mabuchi
 Preliminary Round — 69.76
 Final — 120.20 (→ 12th place)

Women's 10m Platform
Kanoko Tsutani
 Preliminary Round — 48.45
 Final — 70.95 (→ 10th place)

Hatsuko Hirose
 Preliminary Round — 46.15
 Final — 69.71 (→ 11th place)

Fencing

One fencer represented Japan in 1956.

Men's foil
 Masayuki Sano

Men's épée
 Masayuki Sano

Men's sabre
 Masayuki Sano

Football

Gymnastics

Rowing

Japan had nine male rowers participate in one out of seven rowing events in 1956.

 Men's eight
 Yozo Iwasaki
 Yasukuni Watanabe
 Sadahiro Sunaga
 Yoshiki Hiki
 Takashi Imamura
 Yasuhiko Takeda
 Masao Hara
 Junichi Kato
 Toshiji Eda (cox)

Shooting

Six shooters represented Japan in 1956.
Men

Swimming

Weightlifting

Wrestling

References

External links
Official Olympic Reports
International Olympic Committee results database

Nations at the 1956 Summer Olympics
1956
Summer Olympics